Batlejka (Batleyka) is a Belarusian amateur puppet theatre. Its name is derived from the city of Bethlehem and performances are traditionally given over the Christmas period.

It became popular in Belarus in the 16th century but the peak of its popularity falls on the 18-19th centuries. It was largely forgotten during Soviet times but revived in present-day Belarus and within the Belarusian diaspora.

Puppet booth and puppets 
Puppets on metal rods are led by a puppeteer hiding behind a wooden booth with doors. The booth has two levels - the upper ‘heavenly’ or ‘canonical’ level and the lower ‘earthly’ or ‘layman’ level.

Puppets were traditionally made of wood and dressed in colourful  miniature clothes.

Plot

Part 1: Nativity 
King Herod learns from the Three Kings that the Saviour is born. Considering him a rival, King Herod decides to kill Jesus.

He order a soldier to go to Bethlehem and kill all newly born babies. The soldier obeys the order and kills all babies except a baby of Rachael. Angry Herod orders to kill Rachael's baby too.

Herod pays with his life for these crimes - the Death beheads Herod and his body is taken to Hell by the Devil. The soldier soon follows his master.

Part 2: Folk scenes 
This part comprises a number of humorous and satirical episodes involving multiple characters - peasants, tradesmen, aristocracy, etc.

While Part 1 was performed throughout Belarus with little variations, Part 2 varies significantly depending on the geographical region of the performance and the imagination of a particular puppeteer.

References

Further reading 

 Барышаў Г.I., Саннiкаў А. К. Беларускі народны тэатр батлейка. Мн., 1962;
 Бaрышев Г. И. Художественное оформление белорусского кукольного театра батлейки // Белорусское искусство. Сб. статей и материалов, Минск, 1957;
 Бессонов П. Белорусские песни, M., 1871;
 Бядуля З. Бэтлейка и Беларускі тэатр // Вестник Нар. Комиссариата просвещения ССРБ, Минск, 1922. С. 3–4, 11–12;
 Вертеп в Могилеве // Могилевские Губернские Ведомости, 1866, No. 4. стр. 26–29.
 Давидова М. Г. Вертепный театр в русской традиционной культуре // Альманах Традиционная культура No. 1’2002;
 Дзешавой А. Докшыцкі лялечнік // «Маладосць», 1958, No. 9.
 Збірайце матэр’ялы аб бэтлейцы! // «Наша Ніва», Вільня, 1910, No. 44-45, С. 83–84;
 Карский Е. Ф. Рождественская вертепная драма // Белорусы, т. 3, [вып.] 3, П., 1922;
 Кізіма С.А., Лянцэвіч В.М., Самахвалаў Дз.С. Гісторыя Беларусі: Курс лекцый. – Мн.: Выд-ва МІК, 2003. – 91 с.;
 Красьнянскі В. Батлейка віцебскага аддзяленьня беларускага Дзяржаўнага музэю // Інстытут беларускае культуры. Запіскі аддзелу гуманітарных навук, кн. 6 — Працы камісіі гісторыі мастацтва, т. 1, сш. 1, Менск, 1928;
 Лабовіч А. Першая экспазіцыя Дзяржаўнага музея гісторыі тэатральнай і музычнай культуры // Беларускі гістарычны часопіс. No. 3’2003;
 Лозка А. Беларуская батлейка: Каляндарныя i абрадавыя гульнi. Мн., 1997;
 Перетц В. Н. Кукольный театр на Руси (Исторический очерк) // Ежегодник императорских театров. — Приложения. — Кн. 1. — Спб., 1895. — С. 85-185.
 Романов Е. Белорусские тексты вертепного действа. Могилев, 1898. С. 45–46, 49–52;
 Саўчук Н. Беларуская батлейка // Беларускі гістарычны часопіс. No. 3’2003;
 Шeйн П. В. Вертеп, или бетлейки (батлейки) // Материалы для изучения быта и языка русского населения Северо-Западного края, т. 3, СПб, 1902;
 Эpeмич И. Очерки белорусского Полесья // Вестник Западной России, Вильно, 1867, кн. 10, т. 4, отд. 4;
 Юшкевич С. Небо и земля: сценарии для батлейки / С. Юшкевич, И. Лой, А. Досина, Н. Куксачёв. Мн.: Зорны верасень, 2008.

Puppet theaters
Theatre in Belarus
Slavic Christmas traditions
Belarusian traditions